The Hundsrügg (2,047 m) is a mountain of the Bernese Alps, located west of Zweisimmen in the Bernese Oberland. It is the highest point of the chain south of the Jaun Pass and east of the Gastlosen.

References

External links
 Hundsrügg on Hikr

Mountains of the Alps
Two-thousanders of Switzerland
Mountains of the canton of Bern
Mountains of Switzerland